Steve Christiansen (born November 10, 1956) is an American rower. He competed in the men's eight event at the 1976 Summer Olympics.

References

1956 births
Living people
American male rowers
Olympic rowers of the United States
Rowers at the 1976 Summer Olympics
Sportspeople from Perth Amboy, New Jersey
Pan American Games medalists in rowing
Pan American Games bronze medalists for the United States
Rowers at the 1979 Pan American Games